The Supreme Court of Liberia is the highest judicial body in the West African nation of Liberia. The court consists of the Chief Justice of Liberia, who is also the top Judiciary official, and four associate justices, who are nominated by the President and confirmed by the Senate. The justices hold court at the Temple of Justice on Capitol Hill in Monrovia.

The Article III of the Constitution of Liberia stipulates judiciary as one of the three branches of government that ought to be equal and coordinated based on the principle of checks and balances. The court was originally authorized by the 1839 Constitution of the American Colonization Society signed on January 5, 1839, while subsequent constitutions continued to authorize a supreme court, with the 1984 Constitution as the most recent version. Powers and structure of the court are determined by Article VII of the 1984 constitution. The Supreme Court is granted original jurisdiction over constitutional questions, cases in which the country is a party, and for cases where ministers or ambassadors are involved by the Constitution of Liberia.

The Supreme Court, as in other democratic countries, is found to be the weakest among the three arms of democracy. Trial by ordeal is prohibited by the court, but it is still practiced commonly in modern times to adjudge cases.

Jurisdiction and structure

The Article III of the Constitution of Liberia stipulates judiciary as one of the three branches of government that ought to be equal and coordinated based on the principle of checks and balances.
The court was originally authorized by the 1839 Constitution of the American Colonization Society signed on January 5, 1839. Subsequent constitutions continued to authorize a supreme court, with the 1984 Constitution as the most recent version. Powers and structure of the court are determined by Article VII of the 1984 constitution. The Supreme Court is granted original jurisdiction over constitutional questions, cases in which the country is a party, and for cases where ministers or ambassadors are involved by the Constitution of Liberia. The court has appellate jurisdiction over other matters, with the next lowest court being the 15 Circuit Courts. The Court has five members, which is headed by the Chief Justice. The Chief Justice is appointed by the President of the country with the consent of the Senate. The Chief Justice can continue in his office up to the age of 70. The Supreme Court circuit and speciality courts, magistrate courts and justices of the peace.

Eligibility of Justices
The Chief Justice and Associate Justices of the Supreme Court of Liberia must be a citizen of the country for the past ten years previous to his appointment, should be 30 years of age and should be a Counselor at Law Licensed to practice in the supreme court bar, and engaged in the active practice of law for at least seven (7) years prior to his appointment (Judicial Service, Governmental Service and Teaching of Law) citation: Judiciary Law – Title 17 – Liberian Code of Laws Revised 2.4

There are four Associate Justices in the supreme court and they are ranked based on their order of superiority. Any three members of the five can form a quorum and when agreement is not arrived by the quorum in any case, the President of Liberia appoints an ad-hoc judge from the circuit judges based on seniority. There are five special seat of honor in the Supreme Court chambers and the center seat is reserved for the Chief Justice. The two seats immediately adjacent to the Chief Justice are occupied by Associate judges next in rank and the corner most seats on either side for the lower ranked Associates. The seat of the judges are conferred during the appointment ceremony and the chair would remain vacant in the event of death or such extraneous situation until a new judge is appointed.

The current Associate judges of the Supreme Court are Sie-A-Nyene Yuoh, Kabineh Ja'neh, Jamesetta Howard Wolokollie and Philip A. Z. Banks, III.

History

In 1864 one of the most controversial legal battles was fought between two presidents, Joseph Jenkins Roberts, President of Liberia during 1848–55 against Stephen Allen Benson, another president of the country during 1856–63 over charges of land speculation. Roberts won in the lower court on account of his powers, the Supreme Court overturned the decision.

During August 2007, the Supreme Court allowed proceedings against Gyude Bryant, who was an interim President and allegedly stole $1.3 million of government property. The Court noted he was not immune to prosecution as a head of the state as he was not elected by people and was not abiding by laws of the nation.

Criticism
The Supreme Court, as in other democratic countries, is found to be the weakest among the three arms of democracy. Some experts quote the language in the habeas corpus that implies judiciary is powerless against both legislature and executive. Trial by ordeal is prohibited by the court, but it is practiced commonly in modern times. The process of physical examination amounting to ingestion or application of fire warmed machine to the legs of the accused are commonly followed. The suffering has often quoted as discomfort and sometimes lead to death.

During 2005, Liberia acceded to the Second Optional Protocol on the International Covenant on Civil and Political Rights, committing to cease capital punishment. The move was welcomed by United Nations. An amendment was made to the Penal Code in 2008, which indicates "in the event of death occurs during the commission of a crime of armed robbery, terrorism or hijacking, the accused under Section 14.54, 15.32 and 15.33 of the Act shall be sentenced to death by hanging or life imprisonment without possibility of parole". Many human right activists and organizations see this as the reintroduction of death penalty. The Chairman of the Law Reform clarified that the accession was during the interim government and could not be deemed valid.

Notes

References

External links
Recent court decisions
History of the Supreme Court
U.S. Department of State
A Guide to the Liberian Legal System and Legal Research
Republic of Liberia Supreme Court Reports, Volume 1

Judiciary of Liberia
Liberia
Monrovia
1839 establishments in Liberia
Courts and tribunals established in 1839